Rory O'More, also known as Rory Oge O'More (died 1578), was the Irish lord of what became Laois.

Family background
Rory O'More was the second son of Ruairí Ó Mórdha, Captain of Leix, and Margaret, daughter of Thomas Butler and granddaughter of Piers Butler, eighth earl of Ormonde. His family were Chiefs of one of the most important of the Irish clans. Ruairí Caoch Ó Mórdha (fl. 1554), his father, was the son of Connell Ó Mórdha (d. 1537), and early acquired the character of a successful chieftain. On the death of Connell a dispute broke out between his three sons – Lysaght, Kedagh, and Ruairí – and their uncle Peter, who was the Tanist, in line to head the family. Peter was for the time a friend of the Butlers. Consequently, the Lord Deputy of Ireland, Lord Leonard Grey, supported the sons; and, although Peter was acknowledged chief, Grey got hold of him by a ruse, and led him about in chains for some time. Lysaght was killed; Kedagh secured the chieftainship, but died early in 1542, and Ruairí, the third brother, succeeded.

Ruairí Caoch on 13 May 1542 took part in the surrender and regrant process, under the anglicised name "Rory O'More of Lex".  Kedagh had left a son of the same name, who long afterwards, in 1565, petitioned the privy council in Dublin to be restored to his father's inheritance. In a grant afterwards made to his eldest son his services to King King Edward VI are spoken of; but an order of 15 March 1550-1 forbade any of the name of Ó Mórdha to hold land in Leix. 

At some time between 1550 and 1557 Ruairí Ó Mórdha was killed, and was succeeded by Connell Ó Mórdha, who may be the Connell Oge O'More mentioned in 1556 in the settlement of Leix . He was put to death in 1557.

In 1556 Queen Mary approved an Act "..whereby the King and Queen's Majesties, and the Heires and Successors of the Queen, be entituled to the Counties of Leix, Slewmarge, Irry, Glinmaliry, and Offaily, and for making the same Countries Shire Grounds." This shired the new counties of Queen's County (now County Laois) and King's County (now County Offaly), thereby dispossessing the rest of Clan O'More and starting the Plantations of Ireland.

Ruairí Óge and Callagh
Rory left two sons, Callagh and Ruairí Óge. Callagh, who was brought up in England, was called by the English 'The Calough,' and, as he describes himself as of Gray's Inn in 1568, he may be the John Callow who entered there in 1567 (Foster, Reg. of Gray's Inn, p. 39). In 1571 Ormonde petitioned for the Calough's return, and soon afterwards he came back to Ireland, and was granted an estate at Balyna, near Moyvalley, County Kildare in 1574. In 1582 he was thought a sufficiently strong adherent to the English to receive a grant of land in Leix. . Callagh was the father of Rory O'Moore, alias Sir Roger Moore, who was a leader of the Irish Rebellion of 1641.

Rebellion
Ruairí Óge Ó Mórdha, the second son, was constantly engaged in rebellion. He received a pardon on 17 February 1565-6, but in 1571 he was claimed to be dangerous, and in 1572 he was fighting the Earl of Ormond and Queen Elizabeth, being favoured by the weakness of the forces at the command of Francis Cosby, the seneschal of Queen's County, and the temporary absence of Ormond in England. The Butlers and the Fitzgeralds were united against him; but when, in November 1572, the Earl of Desmond escaped from Dublin, it was Ruairí Óge Ó Mórdha who escorted him through Kildare and protected him in Laois. He was involved in the Earl of Kildare's plans in 1574, and was taken prisoner by the English in November. However, he quickly escaped captivity.

The man who would order his killing, Sir Henry Sidney, called O'Mordha 'an obscure and base varlet'. When on his tour in 1575, Sidney wrote of him:

Submission and war
When Sidney came into his territory, O'Mordha went to meet him in Kilkenny Cathedral (December 1575), and 'submitted himself, repenting (as he said) his former faults, and promising hereafter to live in better sort (for worse than he hath been he cannot be)'. A new pardon was granted to him on 4 June 1576 (ib. p. 179). 

On New Year's Day 1577, a massacre of a group of Gaelic gentry by Sir Henry Sidney's troops took place at Mullaghmast in County Kildare. Sidney invited all of the Clan Chiefs and their derbhfine from Laois and Offaly to a peace conference at Mullaghmast. They arrived unarmed and were killed with their whole families by Sidney's troops, who had surrounded the castle. Estimates of the dead range from 40 (the number of Gaelic lords there) to hundreds. O Mordha vowed to avenge the deaths of his relatives. He kidnapped two Englishmen called Harrington and Cosby, relatives of important people.

Ó Mórdha's wife and all but Ó Mórdha himself and one of those who were with him were killed. Ó Mórdha managed to fight his way out, and 'hacked and hewed’ Harrington so that Sidney saw Harrington's brains moving when his wounds were being dressed. Ó Mórdha rushed between a soldier's legs and escaped practically naked.

He hoped for help from Spain, and, with the backing of his friend, John Burke, he prepared to retaliate for the Massacre of Mullaghmast. He allied himself with the Clan O'Connor, and gathered an army. On 18 March 1576-7 the seneschal for Queen's County was ordered to attack Ruairí Óg and the Clan O'Connor with fire and sword. But that same month, Clans O'More and O'Connor avenged Mullaghmast with a raid into the Pale. Sidney wrote to the council the same month: "Rory Oge O'More and Cormock M'Cormock O'Conor have burnt the Naas. They ranne thorough the towne lyke hagges and furies of hell, with flakes of fier fastned on poles ends."

Death
The Queen's agents had put an enormous reward for the time, £1,000, on his head, as was their practice with Irish clan chiefs who resisted. In an attempt to entrap Barnaby Fitzpatrick, 2nd Baron Upper Ossory, into his hands, he was killed by members of the Fitzpatrick family in June 1578, and his head was brought to Dublin Castle, which at the time was ringed by the decapitated heads of major 'rebels'.

Descendants
O'More left a son, Eoghan mac Ruairí Ó Mórdha. John Burke, son of the Earl of Clanricarde, took charge of Eoghan. The English captured him after some difficulty, and he returned and recovered almost all Laois. He was killed in a skirmish near Timahoe on 17 August 1600. English travel writer Fynes Moryson called him 'a bloody and bold young man', and Irish chroniclers the Four Masters 'an illustrious, renowned, and celebrated gentleman'. After his death, the O'Mores as an Irish clan were doomed. 

Colonel Rory O'More (in Irish: Ruairí Óg Ó Mórdha; c.1620-c.1653), principal organiser of the Irish Rebellion of 1641, was his nephew.

The sole descendants of the O'More family that survive to this day are those "house of More O'Ferrall". The hereditary title of “Lord of Laois” was passed down through O’More’s descendants; the current bearer of the title is the head of the More O’Ferralls. The More O’Ferralls also hold the title of “Prince of Annally”, a title that was passed to them through the O’Ferrall family.

Family tree

     Melaghlin mac Owny mac Gilla Padraigh Ó Mórdha, died 1502. 
     |
     |
     |                                                                                |
     |                                                                                |     
     Connell Ó Mórdha (died 1537) Pierce/Peter an Tainiste, fl. 1537. 
     |                                                                                  
     |                                 
     |                     |                       |                                    |                   | 
     |                     |                       |                                    |                   | 
     Lysaght (d. 1541?) Kedagh Roe (d. 1542) Ruairí Caoch Ó Mórdha, fl. 1554.     Gilla Padraigh Connell Óge, d. 1557. 
                           |                      =Margaret Butler d. 1548. 
                           |                       |
                           Kedagh/James?           |
                            fl. 1584?              |                         |
                                                   |                         |
                                                Ruairí Óge, d. 1578.   Calvagh/Callagh of Ballina, d. 1618.
                                                  =?                        =Margaret Scurloug
                                                   |                         |
                                                   |                         |__  
                                          Uaithne (Owney), d. 1600.          |                             |          |        |
                                                                             |                             |          |        |
                                                                             Rory O'More Lysaght Margaret dau.
                                                                            =Jane Barnewall (issue) (issue) (issue)
                                                                                 (issue)

References

Attribution
 Endnotes

1578 deaths
People of Elizabethan Ireland
16th-century Irish people
People from County Laois
O'Moore family
Year of birth unknown